Xie Yuxin (born 12 October 1968 in Xingning, Guangdong) is a retired Chinese international footballer. He made more than 100 appearances for his country in international competitions.

On 6 February 1987, Yuxin signed for PEC Zwolle '82, becoming the first Chinese person to play professional football abroad. He also held the record for being the youngest footballer, 1987-1996, at the age of 18 and youngest scorer, 1988-2003, at the age of 19, for the China national football team.

Club career
Xie Yuxin was a diminutive but highly skilled promising young player who was scouted and then transferred to Dutch football club FC Zwolle and would become the first Chinese player to play in professional football abroad. Unable to help them stay in the Eredivisie he would return to China with Team Guangdong. With the advent of professionalism within China he would go on to join top tier side  Guangdong Winnerway and quickly establish himself as a regular within team. For the next several seasons he would become a vital member within the team's midfield as their creative midfielder until the 1996 league season saw him leave to join newly promoted side Guangzhou Matsunichi. Despite the better pay at his new club he would only stay for one season because of the problems he had with the manager, before returning to Guangdong. His return at Guangdong did not turn out as successful as he had hoped, despite regaining his place back into the team the club had a terrible season that saw them relegated. Considering retiring Xie Yuxin was offered the chance to join Shenyang Sealion and a chance to continue to play in the top tier. Taking this opportunity he became a regular within the team as well as their captain until he decided to leave at the end of the 2001 league season, where he effectively retired. Despite this he took on numerous player coaching roles and officially retired in 2005 with Hunan Shoking.

International career
Xie Yuxin was called up for the national team to play Football at the 1988 Summer Olympics. He later participated in the 1988 AFC Asian Cup, where he played a vital part in the team's fourth-place finish.

International goals

Management career
At the end of 2001 league season, Xie Yuxin began teaching football in Guangdong when he was playing for Guangdong Mingfeng. In early 2003, he started to lead an expedition to Singapore to coach young players to participate in the Singapore's S. League. This led to a coaching position in 2004 at Dongguan Dongcheng and then Hunan Shoking. In October 2005 he took a position as a coach in a Tibetan side, however just 47 days in Tibet he left because of conflicts from his employers and local players, which then lead to him taking a position as coach for Macau. In 2008, he took an assistant coach position at Chinese Super League side Shenzhen Xiangxue Eisiti, until 2010 when he joined Nanjing Yoyo as an assistant coach.

Personal life
Xie Yuxin's son, Xie Weijun, is also a footballer who currently plays for Tianjin TEDA in the Chinese Super League.

References

External links
 FIFA U-17 World Championship 1985, China squad
 

1968 births
Living people
People from Xingning
Hakka sportspeople
Chinese footballers
Footballers from Meizhou
Chinese football managers
China international footballers
Guangdong Winnerway F.C. players
Guangzhou City F.C. players
Changsha Ginde players
Chinese expatriate footballers
PEC Zwolle players
Footballers at the 1988 Summer Olympics
1988 AFC Asian Cup players
1992 AFC Asian Cup players
Olympic footballers of China
Footballers at the 1990 Asian Games
Asian Games silver medalists for China
Medalists at the 1994 Asian Games
Asian Games medalists in football
Association football midfielders
Footballers at the 1994 Asian Games
Guangzhou City F.C. non-playing staff
Chinese expatriate sportspeople in the Netherlands